Aubrey de Sélincourt (7 June 1894 – 20 December 1962) was an English writer, classical scholar, and translator. He was also a keen sailor. He had over 24 books credited to his authorship, but is chiefly remembered for his translations—all for Penguin Classics—of Herodotus' The Histories (1954), Arrian's Life of Alexander the Great (1958), Livy's The Early History of Rome (Books I to V, 1960), and The War with Hannibal (Books XXI to XXX, 1965, posthumous).

Life

De Sélincourt was the son of the businessman Martin de Sélincourt, owner of the Swan & Edgar store in London. His uncle, Henry Fiennes Speed, was the author of Cruises in Small Yachts and Big Canoes (1883). Aubrey was educated at the Dragon School, Oxford, and at Rugby School, from where in 1913 he won an open classical scholarship to University College, Oxford.

Following the outbreak of the First World War, he abandoned his studies to join the army. He was gazetted to the 7th Battalion of the North Staffordshire Regiment on 29 August 1914, and served in Gallipoli, where he was involved in the Battle of Sari Bair in August 1915. He subsequently requested transfer to the Royal Flying Corps and returned to Britain for pilot training: he was awarded his "wings" early in 1917 and joined 25 Squadron on 11 April. On 28 May 1917 he was shot down near Douai, while flying an FE2d, by Werner Voss, becoming the latter's 31st victory. He remained a prisoner for the rest of the war, much of the time at Holzminden prisoner-of-war camp.

Following the war and his discharge from the Royal Air Force, de Sélincourt returned to Oxford, where he was awarded a Half Blue for athletics and took his BA in 1919. He taught at Bembridge School on the Isle of Wight from 1921 to 1924; and as senior classics master at the Dragon School, Oxford, from 1924 to 1929. In 1931 he was appointed Headmaster of Clayesmore School, Dorset, where he remained until 1935.

He edited The Oxford Magazine from 1927 to 1929; and he also contributed to the Manchester Guardian, the English Review, The Times Literary Supplement, and other periodicals. He was a keen yachtsman, and wrote several books on sailing.

After retiring in 1947, de Sélincourt settled at Niton on the Isle of Wight, and devoted himself to writing. He died there in December 1962, shortly after the publication of one of his most successful books, The World of Herodotus.

Family
De Sélincourt had a brother, Guy, and sister, Dorothy. Guy was Bursar at Clayesmore School in Aubrey's time there, and, like him, was a good sailor and historian. He was also an artist and illustrated several of Aubrey's books. Dorothy married A. A. Milne in 1913.

In 1919, de Sélincourt married the poet Irene Rutherford McLeod. They had two daughters: Lesley (who married her first cousin, Christopher Robin Milne) and Anne.

Works
Streams of Ocean (1923, essays)
Isle of Wight (1933)
Family Afloat (1944)
Six O'clock and After and Other Rhymes for Children (1945, with Irene de Sélincourt)
One More Summer (1946)
Calicut Lends a Hand (1946)
Dorset (1947) Vision of England series
Micky (1947)
Three Green Bottles (1941)
A Capful of Wind (1948)
One Good Tern (1943)
The Young Schoolmaster (1948)
Kestrel (1949)
Sailing: A Guide For Everyman (1949)
The Raven's Nest (1949)
Mr Oram's Story. The adventures of Capt. James Cook (1949)
Odysseus the Wanderer (1950)
The Schoolmaster (1951)
On Reading Poetry (1952)
The Channel Shore (1953)
 Herodotus. The Histories (1954, translation)
Cat's Cradle (1955)
Six Great Poets: Chaucer, Pope, Wordsworth, Shelley, Tennyson, The Brownings (1956)
Nansen (1957)
Six Great Englishmen: Drake, Dr. Johnson, Nelson, Marlborough, Keats, Churchill (1957)
Six Great Thinkers: Socrates, St. Augustine, Lord Bacon, Rousseau, Coleridge, John Stuart Mill (1958)
Arrian. Life of Alexander the Great (1958, translation)
Livy. The Early History of Rome: Books I–V of the History of Rome from its Foundation (1960, translation)
The Book of the Sea (1961, anthology)
The World of Herodotus (1962)
Livy. The War with Hannibal: Books XXI–XXX of the History of Rome from its Foundation (1965, translation, posthumously edited by Betty Radice)
Arrian. The Campaigns of Alexander (1971, translation, revised with a new introduction and notes by James R. Hamilton)
Six Great Playwrights (1974)

Sources

References

External links
 Excerpts of Sélincourt's translation of Herodotus' Histories

1894 births
Place of birth missing
1962 deaths
English translators
Greek–English translators
Latin–English translators
British Army personnel of World War I
Royal Air Force personnel of World War I
Royal Flying Corps officers
North Staffordshire Regiment officers
Royal Air Force officers
Schoolteachers from London
People educated at Rugby School
Alumni of University College, Oxford
British World War I prisoners of war
World War I prisoners of war held by Germany
20th-century British translators
20th-century English non-fiction writers
20th-century English educators